İstixana is a village and municipality in the Samukh Rayon of Azerbaijan. It has a population of 656.

References

Populated places in Samukh District